Yugoslavia participated in the Eurovision Song Contest 1982 with the song "Halo, halo" performed by Aska. They were selected in national final called Jugovizija 1982.

Before Eurovision

Jugovizija 1982 
Jugovizija 1982 took place on 12 March 1982 at the TV Studios in Ljubljana. The presenter of the show was Miša Molk. The winner of the national final was selected by 6 state, and 2 autonomous area juries.

At Eurovision
On the night of the contest Yugoslavia performed 14th, following Denmark and preceding Israel. At the close of voting it had received 21 points, placing 14th out of 18 countries. The Yugoslav jury awarded its 12 points to contest winners Germany.

Aska's poor result attracted overwhelming criticism from the Yugoslav media.

Voting

References

1982
Countries in the Eurovision Song Contest 1982
Eurovision